The Logan Creek Patrol Cabin in Glacier National Park is a rustic backcountry log cabin. Built in 1925, the cabin has a single room. It is unusual among Glacier's patrol cabins in lacking a covered porch to offer sheltered firewood storage and protection for the entrance.

References

Ranger stations in Glacier National Park (U.S.)
Park buildings and structures on the National Register of Historic Places in Montana
Residential buildings completed in 1925
Log cabins in the United States
Rustic architecture in Montana
National Register of Historic Places in Flathead County, Montana
Log buildings and structures on the National Register of Historic Places in Montana
1925 establishments in Montana
National Register of Historic Places in Glacier National Park